Fifty civil engineering feats in Turkey or more formally 50 works in 50 years is a list published  in 2005 by the Turkish Chamber of Civil Engineers about fifty prestigious projects of the civil engineering in Turkey. The list has five subsections about regional development, general purpose buildings, transportation, hydrology and industrial buildings.

Formation 
The Chamber of Civil Engineers department of the Union of Chambers of Turkish Engineers and Architects created the list on the 50th anniversary of the organization to enhance awareness in Turkish society about the achievements in the field of civil engineering. In line with this goal, a jury consisting of ten people from different professions, each in their field of expertise, was formed and the process of compiling, evaluating and selecting 50 works began.

On 31 August 2005, all suggestions were consolidated, a collective recommendation list was prepared and evaluation studies were started by the jury members. During the evaluations, it was adopted in principle that the works to be considered should be divided into sections of the field of expertise within the framework of the general grouping principle and that the works within the scope of all civil engineering specialization branches should be evaluated in this project.

The list

References

Civil engineering
Lists of buildings and structures in Turkey